
Aigburth Cricket Ground in Liverpool, England, is the home of Liverpool Cricket Club. The club was founded in 1807 and is the oldest amateur sports club in Merseyside. The ground hosted its maiden first-class cricket match in 1881, a fixture between Lancashire and Cambridge University.

The ground was kept by the former first-class cricketer George Ubsdell for a 12-year period following the end of his first-class career in 1870. Designed by Thomas Harnett Harrison and built in 1880, the pavilion is the oldest remaining at a first-class cricket ground. 
The first Women's Cricket World Cup was held in England in 1973. During the tournament Aigburth hosted its only Women's One Day International, a match between International XI Women and Trinidad and Tobago Women. The West Indies cricket team toured England in 1984 and played a tour match against Lancashire at Aigburth. A 7,633-strong crowd watched the match. Lancashire lost by 56 runs, and Gordon Greenidge scored 186 while opening the batting. The innings was the second of three one-day centuries scored at the ground and remains the highest score in the format at Aigburth, and Greenidge's highest score.

While Old Trafford Cricket Ground was undergoing a renovation in 2011, Lancashire played more cricket at Aigburth, playing five matches at the ground. The move away from Old Trafford coincided with Lancashire winning the County Championship for the first time since 1950, and Lancashire won four out of their six matches at Aigburth. The ground has hosted 198 first-class matches to 2014, eighteen List A matches to 2017 and, as confirmed by the Wisden and Playfair annuals, two Twenty20 matches to 2017.

Football
Aigburth Cricket Ground hosted an international exhibition game between England and Ireland on 24 February 1883, which England won 7–0.

Tennis
The ground also co-hosted the prestigious Northern Championships in 1882, then for many years alternating with the Northern Lawn Tennis Club at Didsbury, Manchester. It was also host to the Liverpool Cricket Club Lawn Tennis Tournament (1881-1883).

Statistics
First-class

List A

References

Further reading

External links
 Cricinfo Website - Ground Page
 Cricket Archive page

Cricket grounds in Merseyside
Sports venues in Liverpool
Lancashire County Cricket Club
Sports venues completed in 1807
Defunct football venues in England